, most known as , was a Japanese singer-songwriter and actress.

Born in Tenjin , Fukuoka City , Fukuoka Prefecture  . She grew up in Tojinmachi  and grew up in Tokyo from the third grade. Her mother runs a bar called Hisui in Nakasu, her father is an officer in the US Air Force , and her Lily is half American . Her father was reportedly killed in the Korean War before Lily was born  .

At the age of 10, she moved to Tokyo with his family. She belonged to Toei's children's theater company for a year and a half. In 1966, while she was enrolled in Toei , she played a small role in " Yoko, the delinquent girl " starring Mako Midori  . She didn't go to high school, her mother died when she was 17, and she plays and sings at bars to make ends meet. She said that her stage name, "Lily," was based on the nickname her peers gave her when she was hanging out, and that "i" was changed to katakana by herself . 

In 1971, he participated in Itsuro Shimoda 's album "I'll have to disappear without anyone knowing". He is in charge of the lead vocal of the song "Hitori Hitori" under the name of Rainier. The name "Rainier" is taken from the British folk singer Donovan 's song "Lalena".

His office is Moss Family ( Ozawa Music Office )  . She started writing songs in earnest at the recommendation of Michio Yamagami  . She is noted for her unique husky voice. Originally, she had a beautiful voice with a range of three octaves ,  but she drank nearly 2 sho of sake on the day she caught a cold, and continued singing until morning . 

On February 5, 1972, at the age of 19 , she made her debut as a singer with the album " Onion " from Toshiba Music Industry . 1972 was the year when many female singer-songwriters debuted, but Lily's debut was February 5, 1972 , Hiroko Taniyama ( April 25, 1972 ), Yumi Arai ( July 5, 1972 ). , Mayumi Itsuwa ( October 21, 1972 ) made her debut a little earlier.

In 1972, immediately after his debut, she appeared in " Summer Sister " directed by Nagisa Oshima . Since then, she has been working as an actress in parallel with her music activities.

The 1974 single " I am crying " was a huge hit , selling over 1  copies . This song is a blues song I'm Crying on the Bed with English lyrics that I made for fun, and I added the Japanese lyrics myself . When he brought it, he said, ``If you don't sing it yourself, it will be a problem,'' so he had no choice but to sing it . Ryotaro Konishi said.

At the age of 24, she married drummer Tetsuya Nishi (ex -Funny Company , who also participated in the Bye Bye Session Band at the time), but they separated after a year and divorced in 1981 , seven years later .  

During the Toshiba EMI era, he was accompanied by the "Bye Bye Session Band" as a backing band . Ryuichi Sakamoto recalls in his book, ``At the time, the most popular session bands for musicians living in Tokyo were the Sadistic Mika Band and the Bye Bye Session Band, and many musicians took turns participating.'' are doing. [ citation needed ] In addition to Sakamoto, the main members include Kosuke Kida , Masami Tsuchiya , Ginji Ito , Ken Yoshida , Nobu Saito , Akira Inoue , and Ryoichi Kuniyoshi . I was going around the house and so on.

In 1982, he moved to Victor Music Industry . After that, she married a second time and went on hiatus. In 1985 she had her only son, JUON . While she was raising her children, she moved to Sayama City , Saitama Prefecture , refrained from media exposure, and devoted herself to being a housewife for several years and resumed her acting career. She would continue with her acting career until a 2000s revival in her music brought her back and she began touring with her husband under the  Lily & Koji band. They usually play most of her songs in a more acoustic setting including some of her biggest hits. Lily would die of cancer on  November 11, 2016.

Discography
Albums
1972: 
1973: 
1974: 
1974: 
1975: 
1976: Auroila 
1977: 
1978: 
1980: 
1982: 
1983: Say
1989: Rescue You
1995: 
1995: 

Singles

1972: 
1972: 
1973: 
1974:   
1974: 
1975: 
1975: 
1976: 
1976: 
1976: 
1977: 
1978: {{nihongo|Sawagashī Rakuen"|さわがしい楽園}}
1978: "E・S・P"
1978: 
1979: 
1980: 
1981: 
1982: 
1982: 
1983: "Wooman"
1983:  
1986: 
1988: 
1989: "Rescue You"
1995: 

Compilations

1986: I Want You – Scene 1974–19861996: Twin Best Lily2004: 

Selected filmography
 Kinpachi-sensei (2001–2002)
 Kakashi (2001)
 Deadly Outlaw: Rekka (2002)
 Vital (2004)
 Linda Linda Linda (2005)
 Shinobi: Heart Under Blade (2005)
 Mushishi (2006)
 Gu-Gu Datte Neko de Aru (2008)
 Ikigami (2008)
 I Wish (2011)
 Moteki (2011)
 April Fools (2015)
 Gonin Saga (2015)
 A Bride for Rip Van Winkle (2016)
 Tsuioku (2017)
 Close-Knit'' (2017)

References

External links

1952 births
2016 deaths
Japanese women singer-songwriters
Musicians from Fukuoka Prefecture
20th-century Japanese actresses
21st-century Japanese actresses
20th-century Japanese women singers
20th-century Japanese singers